3.1 may refer to:
 An approximation of the mathematical constant π
 A shorthand reference to release 3.1 of some piece of software, such as Windows 3.1x